During the dictatorship of Francisco Franco from 1939 to 1975, policies were implemented in an attempt to increase the dominance of the Spanish language, also known as Castilian, over the other languages of Spain. Franco's regime had Spanish nationalism as one of its bases. Under his dictatorship, the Spanish language was declared Spain's only official language.

The use of other languages in the administration was either banned, discouraged or frowned upon depending on the particular circumstances and timing, while the use of non-Castilian names for newborns was forbidden in 1938, except for foreigners.

The situation evolved from the harshest years of the immediate afterwar (especially the 1940s, also the 1950s) to the relative tolerance of the last years (late 1960s and early 1970s); Franco died in 1975, and his successor Juan Carlos of Spain began the Spanish transition to democracy.

Background

Basque and Catalan nationalism 

In both Basque and Catalan nationalism in the early 20th century, language was a central topic and defines both groups national identities, specifically the Basque and Catalan languages, respectively. Language was more stressed in Catalan nationalism than Basque nationalism, however, which preferred to stress race and ethnicity over language. Catalan nationalist communities taught their language and culture to immigrant communities in an effort to assimilate them and preserve their national identity, while Basque nationalists were more opposed to immigration in general.

In politics, Basque and Catalan politicians preferred to speak their native language over Spanish to differentiate themselves from Spanish politicians. In 1932, the Statute of Autonomy of Catalonia of 1932 was implemented and made Catalan the co-official language of Catalonia, together with Spanish. The Statute of Autonomy of the Basque Country of 1936 established Basque as the co-official language of the Basque Country, together with Spanish. Similarly, the Statute of Autonomy of Galicia of 1936 established Galician as the co-official language of Galicia, together with Spanish.

The Spanish language 

As part of the nationalistic efforts:
Spanish films were produced only in Spanish. All foreign films were required to be dubbed, and all films originally produced in the languages of autonomous communities were required to be re-issued in Spanish. The dubbing helped the censorship of unacceptable dialogue.
 Spanish names and Spanish versions of Catholic and classical names were the only ones allowed. Leftist names like  and regional names like even the Catalan  (after Catalonia's patron saint, Saint George) were forbidden and even forcibly replaced in official records. Only Christian names in Spanish were allowed in official documents.

In the first decade of Franco's rule, languages other than Castilian were "confined to private spaces".

In the regime's most radical discourse, languages other than Spanish were often considered "dialects" in the sense of speeches that were not developed enough to be "real languages". Basque was different enough that it could not be taken as a debased form of Spanish but was despised as a rural language of limited currency, unfit for modern discourse. This never happened at the academic level, though.

All these policies became less strict and more permissive as time passed.

Evolution 

The Press Law of Manuel Fraga Iribarne replaced the pre-publication censorship with after-the-fact punishments.

Situation by areas 

Most notably, several sporting organizations—including FC Barcelona and Athletic Bilbao, among others—were forced to change their names from the local language to Spanish. In fact, Atlético Madrid, itself with roots in Athletic Bilbao, received its current name as a result of Franco's language policies, in 1941.

Aragon 

Aragonese language

Asturias 

Asturian language

Balearic Islands 

Balearic

Basque Country 

 Basque language
 The Catholic Church had supported the Basque nationalists aligned with the Republic.
 Creation of Standard Basque by Euskaltzaindia
 Unofficial Basque-language schools (ikastola).

Catalonia 

 Catalan language
 Salvador Espriu
 Joan Manuel Serrat was not allowed to sing La La La in Catalan for the Eurovision Song Contest 1968 since the contest forbid to sing in non-official languages from 1966 to 1973 and, unwilling to sing it in Spanish, was replaced by Massiel, who won the contest.

Galicia 

 Galician language
 The exiles and emigrants in Buenos Aires took a great role in Galician literature.
 The nationalist resistance in Spain in partnership with the exiled abroad denounce the repression, censorship and veto of the Francoist regime about public use and printing in Galician language (for example, forbidding the publishing a translation of Martin Heidegger) and other Spanish languages. The protest was taken before the VIII UNESCO Conference at Montevideo in 1954 (when Spain was about to be admitted, and where the Montevideo Resolution was taken), with a 32-page text called Denuncia da perseguizón do idioma galego pol-o Estado Hespañol ("Denounce of the persecution against the Galician language by the Spanish State"), written by Ramón Piñeiro López and distributed to the audience in Galician, English and French. The action was discussed in the book A batalla de Montevideo ("The Montevideo battle") by Alonso Montero and reactivated in claims in the present day.

León 

 Leonese language

Spanish Guinea 

 Pichinglis
 Fernando Poo
 Río Muni
 History of Equatorial Guinea
 Annobonese language (Fá d'Ambô)

Navarre 

CA Osasuna was allowed to maintain its Basque name, unlike other football teams with non-Spanish names.

Spanish North Africa 

 Ceuta, Melilla, Spanish Morocco, Spanish Sahara, international Tangier

Valencian Community 

Valencian

Caló 

Caló (Spanish Romani)

See also 

 Language policy in France
 Language politics
 If you're Spanish, speak Spanish!

References

Citations

Bibliography

External links 

Cronologia de la repressió de la llengua i la cultura catalanes ("Chronology of the repression of Catalan language and culture", in Catalan with Spanish quotations).
Ministerio de la Gobernación (Gazeta of 17 May 1940) (CCITT T.& G4 Facsimile TIFF). Order of 16 May 1940 forbidding the use of generic foreign terms in lettering, samples, advertisements, etc.

Francoist Spain
Francoist
Language policy in Spain
Sociolinguistics
Linguistic discrimination